Ozyorskoye is a rural locality in Vyborgsky District of Leningrad Oblast, Russia, located on the Karelian Isthmus. Until the Winter War and Continuation War, it had been the administrative center of the Vuoksenranta Municipality of Viipuri Province, Finland.

Rural localities in Leningrad Oblast
Karelian Isthmus